Diego de Avendaño (1594 in Segovia – 1698), was a Peruvian Jesuit, a theologian, jurist and moral philosopher. He was the author of the monumental Thesaurus Indicus, a study of the legal and moral issues typical of life in the Spanish-American colonies.

Life
Diego de Avendaño was born in Segovia in 1594 and moved to South America at an early age. He was educated by Jesuits in South America and joined their order. He became professor of Theology and Rector of the Colegio Máximo de San Pablo de Lima, and served as provincial of the Jesuits in Peru. Very little is known about his personal life. His books were published in Europe.

Works
Epithalamium Christi et Sacrae Sponsae (Lyon, 1653).
Amphitheatrum misericordiae (Lyon, 1656).
Cartas annuas de la Provincia del Perú de la Compañía de Jesús de los años 1663 a 1665 al R. P. General de la misma Compañía (manuscript, now lost).
Expositio Psalmi LXVIII (Lyon, 1666).
Thesaurus Indicus (Antwerp, 1668-1686).
Actuarium Indicum (Antwerp, 1675-1686).
Problemata theologica (Antwerp, 1678).
Cursus consummatus (Antwerp, 1686).

Sources
G. Andrade, "En torno a Avendaño y Sahagún: diferentes encuentros con el Otro en la colonia", Revista de Filosofía 45:3 (2003): 7-25.
F. Arvizu Y Galarraga, "El pensamiento jurídico del P. Diego de Avendaño S.I.: Notas de interés para el Derecho Indiano", IX Congreso del Instituto Internacional de Historia del Derecho Indiano. Actas y Estudios, vol. 1 (Madrid, 1991), pp. 137–150.
J. Ballon, "Diego de Avendaño (1594-1688) y los orígenes coloniales de la filosofía en el Perú", Patio de Letras 2:2 (2004): 97-107.
Vincent P. Franklin, "Alonso De Sandoval and the Jesuit Conception of the Negro", The Journal of Negro History 58:3 (1973): 349-360.
P. Hernández Aparicio, "La doctrina de Avendaño sobre los repartimientos de indios", in Proyección y presencia de Segovia en América. Actas del Congreso Internacional (23-28 de abril de 1991), ed. M. Cuesta Domingo (Segovia, 1992), pp. 411–419.
A. Losada, "Diego de Avendaño S. I. moralista y jurista, defensor de la dignidad humana de indios y negros en América", Missionalia Hispanica 15 (1982): 1-18.
Angel Muñoz Garcia, Diego de Avendaño (1594-1698): filosofía, moralidad, derecho y política en el Perú colonial (Lima, 2003)

External links
Thesaurus Indicus, Volume 1 on Google Books
Thesaurus Indicus, Volume 2 on Google Books.

1594 births
17th-century Peruvian Jesuits
1698 deaths
Jesuit theologians
Jesuit philosophers
Spanish emigrants to Peru
17th-century Spanish philosophers
17th-century Spanish Roman Catholic theologians
Peruvian centenarians
Men centenarians